Opio is an American rapper. The term may also refer to:
Opio, Alpes-Maritimes
Opium, a 1949 Mexican film whose original Spanish title is Opio
"Opio", a song by Hieroglyphics on the album 3rd Eye Vision
Opio (surname)